Allan Robert Burdon (11 December 1914 – 18 June 2001) was an Australian politician who represented the South Australian House of Assembly seat of Mount Gambier from 1962 to 1975 for the Labor Party.

References

Members of the South Australian House of Assembly
Australian Labor Party members of the Parliament of South Australia
1914 births
2001 deaths
20th-century Australian politicians